Eths or ETHS may refer to:
 Eths, a French metal band
 East Tennessee Historical Society
 Faßberg Air Base (ICAO code)

Schools 
 Eastern Technical High School, Essex, Maryland, United States
 El Toro High School, Lake Forest, California, United States
 Evanston Township High School, Evanston, Illinois, United States

See also 
 Eth (disambiguation)